The second season of Chicago Med, an American medical drama television series with executive producer Dick Wolf, and producers Michael Brandt, Peter Jankowski, Andrew Schneider and René Balcer The second season premiered September 22, 2016 and concluded on May 11, 2017. The season contained 23 episodes.

Plot
Chicago Med focuses on the emergency department at Gaffney Chicago Medical Center and on its doctors and nurses as they work to save patients' lives.

Cast

Main
 Nick Gehlfuss as Dr. Will Halstead, Attending Emergency Physician
 Yaya DaCosta as April Sexton, RN
 Torrey DeVitto as Dr. Natalie Manning, Pediatric/Emergency Resident
 Rachel DiPillo as Dr. Sarah Reese, Psychiatry Resident 
 Colin Donnell as Dr. Connor Rhodes, Cardiothoracic Surgery Fellow
 Brian Tee as LCDR Dr. Ethan Choi, Chief Resident
 S. Epatha Merkerson as Sharon Goodwin, Chief of Services
 Oliver Platt as Dr. Daniel Charles, Chief of Psychiatry
 Marlyne Barrett as Maggie Lockwood, RN, ED Charge Nurse

Recurring

Special guest star
 Betty Buckley as Olga Barlow

Crossover characters

Episodes

Production

Casting
After appearing in the season 1 finale, Jeff Hephner appeared as former firefighter, current fourth-year med student Jeff Clarke for multiple episodes in season 2. Mekia Cox joins the cast as Dr. Robin Charles, an epidemiologist and daughter of Dr. Daniel Charles, in a recurring role.

Ratings

Home media
The DVD release of season two was released in Region 1 on August 29, 2017.

References

External links
 
 

2016 American television seasons
2017 American television seasons
Chicago Med seasons